Troiano Acquaviva of Aragon (14 January 1696 – 20 March 1747) was an Italian cardinal and Catholic archbishop. Acquaviva was from a noble family with close ties to the Spanish crown; he was the nephew of Cardinal Francesco Acquaviva d'Aragona. Created cardinal in 1732, the following year he became cardinal-protector of Santa Cecilia in Trastevere, for which he provided a new façade. In 1734 King Philip V of Spain appointed him Spanish ambassador to the Holy See.

Biography
Troiano Acquaviva was born in Atri, the son of Gian Girolamo Acquaviva d'Aragona, 13th duke of Atri, and his second wife, Eleonora Spinelli. His brother,  Girolamo Acquaviva, succeeded to the family title. Troiano was educated in Rome under his uncle Cardinal Francesco Acquaviva d'Aragona. From March to August 1721 he was pontifical vice-delegate in Bologna. In the same year Pope Innocent XIII gave him the government of Ancona, from which he was recalled in 1725 by Pope Benedict XIII, who wanted him to be his major domo in Rome.

Troiano Acquaviva, was ordained a priest on 17 April 1729. The next day he was elected titular bishop of Filippopoli di Arabia and consecrated bishop on 3 May that year in Benevento by Pope Clement XI. On 14 May 1729 he was appointed prefect of the Pontifical Household and 6 July Prefect of the Apostolic Palace. On 14 August 1730 he was appointed titular Archbishop of Larissa.

He was created cardinal by Pope Clement XII in the consistory of 1 October 1732, and on 17 November that year he received the titular designation of Santi Quirico e Giulitta, whose restoration was not quite complete. On 19 January 1733 succeeded his uncle at the titular church of Santa Cecilia in Trastevere. Acquaviva underwrote a new façade. In 1732, Charles of Bourbon began to make use of Cardinal Acquaviva as his unofficial, representative to the Holy See.

In 1734 Philip V of Spain named Acquaviva Spanish ambassador to the Holy See, just as his uncle had been some time before. He then moved to the ambassador's residence, the Palazzo di Spagna. From 1738 he was cardinal protector of the Kingdom of Naples and Sicily. On 4 May 1739 he was elected Archbishop of Monreale.

He participated in the conclave of 1740, in which he was the bearer of veto by Philip V of Spain against the election of Cardinal Pier Marcellino Corradini. He was also an adviser to Pope Benedict XIV, in the matter of the Church's charges against King Charles III of Naples during the war for the succession to the throne of Austria.

On the recommendation of the powerful Don Lelio Caraffa, Duke of Maddaloni. he employed a young Giacomo Casanova as a clerical scribe. When Casanova became the scapegoat for a scandal involving a local pair of star-crossed lovers, Cardinal Acquaviva dismissed him, thanking him for his service,

From April 1743 he was cardinal protector of Spain and from 3 February 1744 to 25 January 1745, Camerlengo of the Sacred College of Cardinals.

In 1745, succeeding his brother Domenico, he had become the eighteenth Duke of Atri. He died on 20 March 1747, in Rome, after a long and painful illness; Pope Benedict XIV presided at his funeral. He was buried in the Basilica of Santa Cecilia in Trastevere.

References

Bibliography

 

18th-century Italian cardinals
18th-century Italian Roman Catholic bishops
House of Acquaviva
1696 births
1747 deaths
17th-century Neapolitan people
18th-century Neapolitan people